Groupees Unreleased EP is an extended play by the American electronic rock project, Celldweller. On May 2, 2011, Klayton announced a 72 Hour Exclusive 4EP Bundle Sale on Groupees with 20% of the benefits going to Red Cross for Tornado Relief. The bundle included the Unreleased EP, which contained previously unreleased tracks and remixes, including a song from the then unreleased Soundtrack for the Voices in My Head Vol. 2 Chapter 02 and a previously unreleased Beta Cessions demo. If the goal of $10,000 reached within the duration of the promotion, two more tracks would be unlocked for every donor. This goal was later decreased to $6,000 and was reached. The top donor was rewarded with a bonus unreleased track which is exclusively his/her until its official release. The EP was only available for 72 hours, from May 4 to May 7, therefore it is no longer available.

Track listing

Bonus tracks

References 

Celldweller albums
2011 EPs